Cryptocarya rigida is a small tree or shrub growing in high rainfall areas in north eastern New South Wales, Australia. It was described in 1864 by Carl Meissner in Prodromus Systematis Naturalis Regni Vegetabilis. Extinct in the Illawarra region (34° S), allegedly seen in the Illawarra in 1818 by Allan Cunningham.

Habitat 

Common around rainforest or eucalyptus ecotone areas, generally on the poorer soils at the edge of rainforests. It is found from Wyong (33° S) in New South Wales to the border of the state of Queensland at the McPherson Range (28° S).

Description 

Cryptocarya rigida, known as the rose maple or forest maple reaches a height of ten metres and a trunk diameter of around 20 cm.

The bark is grey, with a thin corky layer.  Leaves are simple and entire, often broadest at the base, 6 to 13 cm long tapering to a long point. The upper surface is green. The underside is pale, nearly white.

The midrib is hairy, channeled above, raised below. Cream flowers appear from June to October, being unscented, downy in panicles 1 to 2.5 cm long.

The fruit is a drupe. Shiny, bluish/black when ripe, oval and often pointed. 11 to 15 mm wide and 21 to 24 mm long with a single seed.

Like most Australian Cryptocarya fruit, removal of the fleshy aril is advised to assist seed germination, which is slow but reliable with Cryptocarya rigida.

References

External links

Laurales of Australia
Trees of Australia
Flora of New South Wales
Flora of Queensland
rigida